Agnar "Ag" Pytte (December 23, 1932 – November 6, 2015) was the fourth President of Case Western Reserve University.

Pytte was born in Kongsberg, Norway, on December 23, 1932, to Ole and Edith (Christiansen) Pytte.

During his senior year of high school, Pytte moved to the United States in 1949 to attend Phillips Exeter Academy in New Hampshire. He received his bachelor's degree in physics from Princeton University in 1953. He married Anah Currie Loeb on June 18, 1955. After receiving his Ph.D. in 1958 from Harvard University, he accepted a faculty position at Dartmouth College in Physics and Astronomy. Pytte later served as chairman of that department, Associate Dean of Faculty, Dean of Graduate Studies, and provost during the presidency of David T. McLaughlin. In 1987, he left Dartmouth to become the fourth president of Case Western Reserve University in Cleveland, Ohio.

During Pytte's twelve years as president, the university completed $325 million in capital projects, including the Mandel School of Applied Social Sciences (now the Jack, Joseph, and Morton Mandel School of Applied Social Sciences), Richard F. Celeste Biomedical Research Building, Kent Hale Smith Engineering and Science Building, George S. Dively Executive Education Center, and Veale Athletic Center.

Pytte served on the board of directors for Goodyear Tire and Rubber Company from 1988–2004. He was a member of the American Physical Society, Sigma Xi, and Phi Beta Kappa.

He died November 6, 2015, in Hanover, New Hampshire, of complications from Parkinson’s disease.

References

External links
 Case Western Reserve University bio

1932 births
People from Kongsberg
2015 deaths
Case Western Reserve University faculty
Goodyear Tire and Rubber Company people
Dartmouth College faculty
Harvard University alumni
Princeton University alumni
Presidents of Case Western Reserve University